= Oregon & California Express =

Passenger train in the western United States

Overview
- Service type: Inter-city rail
- Status: Discontinued
- Locale: Northern California and Oregon
- First service: December 17, 1887
- Last service: November, 1924
- Former operator: Southern Pacific

Route
- Termini: Oakland, California; Portland, Oregon

Technical
- Track gauge: 4 ft 8 1/2 in (1,435 mm) standard gauge

The Oregon & California Express was a passenger train of the Southern Pacific on its route between Oakland, California, and Portland, Oregon. Express trains numbered 15 and 16 began operation upon completion of Southern Pacific's Siskiyou Line on December 17, 1887. These trains were briefly called the Shasta Limited from 1895 to 1897. Trains 15 and 16 were discontinued as part of a major reorganization of Southern Pacific train service in November, 1924.
